Francis Marie de Wolff (7 January 191318 April 1984) was an English character actor. Large, bearded, and beetle-browed, he was often cast as villains in both film and television.

Life and career
Born in Essex, he made his film debut in Flame in the Heather (1935), and made many other appearances in such films as Fire Over England (1937), Treasure Island (1950), Scrooge (1951), as the Ghost of Christmas Present, Ivanhoe (1952), Moby Dick (1956), Saint Joan (1957), From Russia with Love (1963), and Carry On Cleo (1964).

He is perhaps best remembered, however, as a supporting player in horror movies of the 1950s and 1960s, many of them for Hammer Films. These include Corridors of Blood (1958), The Hound of the Baskervilles (1959), The Man Who Could Cheat Death (1959), The Two Faces of Dr. Jekyll (1960), Devil Doll (1964), and The Black Torment (1964). His last film appearance was in The Three Musketeers (1973).

His television appearances include The Avengers, Maigret, Richard the Lionheart, Danger Man, Doctor Who, The Ordeal of Richard Feverel, The Saint, Rookery Nook, Paul Temple, Dixon of Dock Green, The Tomorrow People, and the miniseries Jesus of Nazareth.

Filmography

Ten Minute Alibi (1935)
Flame in the Heather (1935) as Hawley
Line Engaged (1935) (uncredited)
Fire Over England (1937) as Sir James Tarleton
It's Hard to Be Good (1948) as Fighting Neighbour (uncredited)
Cardboard Cavalier (1949) as Soldier
Adam and Evelyne (1949) as 2nd Man at Restaurant Bar (uncredited)
Trottie True (1949) as George Edwards (uncredited)
Under Capricorn (1949) as Major Wilkins
Treasure Island (1950) as Black Dog
The Naked Heart (1950) as Papa Suprenant
She Shall Have Murder (1950) as Police Inspector
The Powder Monkey (1951 TV movie) as Ben
Flesh and Blood (1951) as Ambassador (uncredited)
Scrooge (1951) as Spirit of Christmas Present
Tom Brown's Schooldays (1951) as Squire Brown
Ivanhoe (1952) as Front De Boeuf
Miss Robin Hood (1952) as Accident Policeman
Moulin Rouge (1952) as Victor (uncredited)
The Master of Ballantrae (1953) as Matthew Bull
The Kidnappers (1953) as Jan Hooft Sr.
The Diamond (1954) as Yeo
The Man Upstairs (1954 TV movie) as Cyrus Armstrong
The Seekers (1954) as Capt. Bryce
Geordie (1955) as Samson
King's Rhapsody (1955) as The Prime Minister
Here's Archie (1956 TV movie) as Tutor
Moby Dick (1956) as Captain Gardiner
Odongo (1956) as George Watford
The Smallest Show on Earth (1957) as Albert Hardcastle
Saint Joan (1957) as La Tremouille
Sea Fury (1958) as Mulder
The Roots of Heaven (1958) as Father Farque
Corridors of Blood (1958) as Black Ben
The Hound of the Baskervilles (1959) as Doctor Richards Mortimer
The Man Who Could Cheat Death (1959) as Inspector Legris
Tommy the Toreador (1959) as Hotel Proprietor 
The Savage Innocents (1960) as Trading Post Proprietor
The Two Faces of Dr. Jekyll (1960) as Inspector
Clue of the Twisted Candle (1960) as Ramon Karadis
The Curse of the Werewolf (1961) as Bearded Customer (uncredited)
The Silent Invasion (1962) as Emile
The Durant Affair (1962) as Mario Costello
Siege of the Saxons (1963) as The Blacksmith
From Russia with Love (1963) as Vavra
The World Ten Times Over (1963) as Shelbourne
The Three Lives of Thomasina (1963) as Targu
Devil Doll (1964) as Dr. Keisling
The Black Torment (1964) as Black John
Carry On Cleo (1964) as Agrippa
Licensed to Kill (1965) as Walter Pickering
The Liquidator (1965) as Ambassador Dragov (uncredited)
Triple Cross (1966) as German Colonel General
Ghosts – Italian Style (1968) as The Scotsman
The Fixer (1968) as Warden
Sinful Davey (1969) as Andrew
Rookery Nook (1970 TV movie) as Mr. Putz
The Canterbury Tales (1972) as The Bride's Father (uncredited)
The Three Musketeers (1973) as Sea Captain

References

External links

1913 births
1984 deaths
20th-century English male actors
English male film actors
English male television actors
Male actors from Essex